Churchill is a town in northern Manitoba, Canada, on the west shore of Hudson Bay, roughly  from the Manitoba–Nunavut border. It is most famous for the many polar bears that move toward the shore from inland in the autumn, leading to the nickname "Polar Bear Capital of the World," and to the benefit of its burgeoning tourism industry.

Geography
Churchill is located on Hudson Bay, at the mouth of the Churchill River on the 58th parallel north, far above most Canadian populated areas. While not part of the city, Eskimo Point and Eskimo Island are located across river with the former site of the Prince of Wales Fort.

History
A variety of nomadic Arctic peoples lived and hunted in this region. The Thule people arrived around the year 1000 from the west, the ancestors of the present-day Inuit. The Dene people arrived around the year 500 from farther north. Since before the time of European contact, the region around Churchill has been predominantly inhabited by the Chipewyan and Cree peoples.

Europeans first arrived in the area in 1619 when a Danish expedition led by Jens Munk wintered near where Churchill would later stand. Only 3 of 64 expedition members survived the winter and sailed one of the expedition's two ships, the sloop Lamprey, back to Denmark. Danish archaeologists in 1964 discovered remains of the abandoned ship, the frigate Unicorn, in the tidal flats some kilometres from the mouth of the river. The discoveries were all taken to Denmark; some are on display at the National Museum in Copenhagen.

After an abortive attempt in 1688–89, in 1717 the Hudson's Bay Company built the first permanent settlement, Churchill River Post, a log fort a few kilometres upstream from the mouth of the Churchill River. The trading post and river were named after John Churchill, 1st Duke of Marlborough, who was governor of the Hudson's Bay Company in the late 17th century. The fort, Prince of Wales Fort, was rebuilt at the mouth of the river. The fort was built mostly to capitalize on the North American fur trade, out of the reach of York Factory. It dealt mainly with the Chipewyan living north of the boreal forest. Much of the fur came from as far away as Lake Athabasca and the Rocky Mountains. A defensive battery, Cape Merry Battery, was built on the opposite side of the fort to provide protection.

As part of the Anglo-French dispute for North America, in 1731–1741 the original fort was replaced with Prince of Wales Fort, a large stone fort on the western peninsula at the mouth of the river. In 1782, the French Hudson Bay expedition, led by La Pérouse, captured it. Since the British, under Samuel Hearne, were greatly outnumbered and in any event were not soldiers, they surrendered without firing a shot. The leaders agreed Hearne would be released and given safe passage to England, along with 31 British civilians, in the sloop Severn, on condition he immediately publish his story A Journey to the Northern Ocean. In return, the British promised the same number of French prisoners would be released and a British navigator familiar with the waters safely conduct the French from Hudson's Bay at a time of year when the French risked becoming trapped in winter ice. The French made an unsuccessful attempt to demolish the fort. The worst effect was on the local indigenous peoples, who had become dependent on trade goods from the fort, and many of them starved. Extensive reconstruction and stabilization of the fort's remains have taken place since the 1950s.

In 1783, Hearne returned to build a new fort, a short distance upriver. Due to its distance from areas of heavy competition between the North West Company and the Hudson's Bay Company, it remained a stable, if not profitable, source of furs.

Between the years of decline in the fur trade and surfacing of western agricultural success, Churchill phased into and then back out of obsolescence. After decades of frustration over the monopoly and domination of the Canadian Pacific Railway, western Canadian governments banded together and argued for the creation of a major new northern shipping harbour on Hudson Bay, linked by rail from Winnipeg. Initially Port Nelson was selected for this purpose in 1912. After several years of effort and millions of dollars, this project was abandoned and Churchill was selected as the alternative after World War One. Surveys by the Canadian Hydrographic Service ship  opened the way for safe navigation. However, construction and use of the railroad was extremely slow and the rail line itself did not come to Churchill until 1929.

Once the link from farm to port was completed, commercial shipping took many more years to pick up. In 1932 Grant MacEwan was the first person to cross through Churchill customs as a passenger. This was purely due to his determination in taking the Hudson Bay route to Saskatchewan from Britain—most passengers returned via the St. Lawrence River.

After World War Two, the base served several other purposes including as a Royal Canadian Air Force (RCAF) and a Strategic Air Command facility. Following the demolition of the base it was repurposed into the town's airport.

Naval Radio Station Churchill, call sign CFL, was activated as an ionospheric study station by the Royal Canadian Navy in support of the U-boat high-frequency direction finding (HFDF) net and became operational on 1 August 1943. Around 1949, Churchill became part of the Canadian SUPRAD (signals intelligence) network and remained in that role until it closed its doors in 1968. The Operations and Accommodations building remains today but is abandoned.

This area was also the site of the Churchill Rocket Research Range, part of Canadian-American atmospheric research. Its first rocket was launched in 1956, and it continued to host launches for research until closing in 1984. The site of the former rocket range now hosts the Churchill Northern Studies Centre, a facility for multidisciplinary Arctic research.

In the 1950s, the British government considered establishing a site near Churchill for testing their early nuclear weapons, before choosing Australia instead.

Environment
Churchill is situated at the estuary of the Churchill River at Hudson Bay. The small community stands at an ecotone, on the Hudson Plains at the juncture of three ecoregions: the boreal forest to the south, the Arctic tundra to the northwest, and the Hudson Bay to the north.

The landscape around Churchill is influenced by shallow soils caused by a combination of subsurface permafrost and Canadian Shield rock formation. The black spruce dominant tree cover is sparse and stunted from these environmental constraints. There is also a noticeable ice pruning effect to the trees. The area also offers sport fishing. Several tour operators offer expeditions on land, sea and air, using all terrain vehicles, tundra buggies, boats, canoes, helicopters as well as ultralight aircraft.

Aurora borealis
Like all northern communities in Canada, Churchill can sometimes see the aurora borealis (Northern Lights) when there is a high amount of solar activity and the skies are clear, usually February and March. Visibility also depends on the sky being dark enough to see them, which usually precludes their visibility in the summer due to nautical twilight all night long.

Climate
Churchill has a subarctic climate (Köppen climate classification: Dfc) with long very cold winters, and short, cool to mild summers. Churchill's winters are colder than a location at a latitude of 58 degrees north should warrant, given its coastal location. The shallow Hudson Bay freezes, eliminating any maritime moderation. Juneau, Alaska, by contrast, is also at 58 degrees north but is moderated by the warmer and deeper Pacific Ocean. Juneau's  January average temperature is a full  warmer than Churchill's. Yet in summer, when the Hudson Bay thaws, Churchill's summer is moderated.

Churchill's  July average temperature is similar to Juneau's  July average.

Economy
Tourism and ecotourism are major contributors to the local economy, with the polar bear season (October and November) being the largest. Tourists also visit to watch beluga whales in the Churchill River in June and July. The area is also popular for birdwatchers and to view the aurora borealis.

The Port of Churchill is the terminus for the Hudson Bay Railway operated by the Arctic Gateway Group. The port facilities handle shipments of grain and other commodities around the world. The Churchill Northern Studies Centre also attracts visitors and academics from around the world interested in sub-Arctic and Arctic research. The town also has a health centre, several hotels, tour operators, and restaurants; it serves locals and visitors.

Ecotourism

Churchill is situated along Manitoba's  coastline, on Hudson Bay at the meeting of three major biomes: marine, boreal forest and tundra, each supporting a variety of flora and fauna. Each year, 10,000–12,000 eco-tourists visit, about 400–500 of whom are birders.

Polar bears
Polar bears were once thought to be solitary animals that would avoid contact with other bears except for mating. In the Churchill region, however, many alliances between bears are made in the fall. These friendships last only until the ice forms, then it is every bear for itself to hunt ringed seals. Starting in the 1980s, the town developed a sizable tourism industry focused on the migration habits of the polar bear. Tourists can safely view polar bears from specially modified vehicles built to navigate the tundra terrain. Utilizing a set of trails created by the Canadian and US military, responsible tour operators are granted permits to access these trails for wildlife viewing. Staying on these established trails ensures no further damage is done to the tundra ecosystem. October and early November are the most feasible times to see polar bears, thousands of which wait on the vast peninsula until the water freezes on Hudson Bay so they can return to hunt their primary food source, ringed seals. There are also opportunities to see polar bears in the non-winter months, with tours via boat visiting the coastal areas where polar bears can be found both on land and swimming in the sea.

Many locals even leave their cars unlocked in case someone needs to make a quick escape from the polar bears in the area. Local authorities maintain a so-called "polar bear jail" where bears (mostly adolescents) who persistently loiter in or close to town, are held after being tranquillised, pending release back into the wild when the bay freezes over. It is the subject of a poem, Churchill Bear Jail, written by Salish Chief Victor A. Charlo.

Beluga whales
Thousands of beluga whales, which move into the warmer waters of the Churchill River estuary during July and August to calf, are a major summer attraction. Polar bears are present as well, and can sometimes be seen from boat tours at this time of year.

Birds
Churchill is also a destination for birdwatching from late May until August and there are normally 175 species found there. Birders have recorded more than 270 species within a  radius of Churchill, including snowy owl, tundra swan, American golden plover and gyrfalcon. More than 100 birds, including parasitic jaeger, Smith's longspur, stilt sandpiper, and Harris's sparrow nest there. Other birds that are seen around Churchill, but less often, include the northern hawk-owl, three-toed woodpecker and the Ross's gull.

Health care

The town has a modern health centre, operated by the Winnipeg Regional Health Authority, which employs about 129 people including six doctors and eighteen nurses. It provides 21 acute care beds, dental care and diagnostic laboratories to service the residents of Churchill and the regions of Nunavut.

Arctic research

Churchill Northern Studies Centre
It provides accommodations, meals, equipment rentals, and logistical support to scientific researchers who work on a diverse range of topics of interest to northern science.

Churchill Marine Observatory
As of late 2019, the Churchill Marine Observatory (CMO) is currently under construction by the University of Manitoba with federal funds. It will facilitate studies to address technological, scientific and economic issues pertaining to Arctic oil spills, gas exploration, and other contaminants. The facility will be located in the Churchill estuary, and will consist of two saltwater sub-pools designed to simultaneously accommodate contaminated and control experiments on various scenarios of the behaviour of oil spills in sea ice. The concrete pools will be equipped with a movable fabric roof to control snow cover and ice growth, and various sensors and instruments to allow real-time monitoring. The project is estimated to cost about $32 million. The lead scientist is David G. Barber, a professor at the University of Manitoba and Canada Research Chair in Arctic-System Science.

Transportation

Churchill Airport, formerly a United States and Canadian military base, is serviced by Calm Air operating scheduled flights connecting Churchill to Winnipeg.

The privately owned Port of Churchill is Canada's principal seaport on the Arctic Ocean. The port was originally constructed by the government in the 1930s, although the idea of building such an Arctic deep water port originated in the 19th century. It is the only Arctic Ocean seaport connected to the North American railway grid. The port is capable of servicing Panamax vessels. The presence of ice on Hudson Bay restricts navigation from mid-autumn to mid-summer. Churchill experiences the highest tides in Hudson Bay. The Churchill estuary has a narrow entrance, and ships planning to moor at the port have to execute a relatively tight 100 degree turn. Maritime transportation companies, Nunavut Sealink and Supply (NSSI) as Groupe Desgagnés, and Nunavut Eastern Arctic Sealink (NEAS) both have bases in Churchill and provide sealift to Nunavik and all Nunavut communities. The port was used for the export of Canadian grain to European markets, with rail-sea connections made at Churchill.

There are no roads from Churchill that connect to the Canadian highway network. The only overland route connecting Churchill to the rest of Canada is the Hudson Bay Railway, formerly part of the Canadian National Railway (CN) network, which connects the Port of Churchill and the town's railway station to CN's rail line at The Pas. The Winnipeg–Churchill train, operated by Via Rail, provides passenger service between Churchill station in downtown Churchill and Union Station in downtown Winnipeg twice per week and from The Pas once per week. The  journey from Winnipeg takes approximately 40 hours, and services many smaller communities in northern Manitoba and eastern Saskatchewan.

In 1997, the railway line and port were sold by the Canadian government to the American railway-holding company OmniTRAX. The government of Manitoba proposed in 2010 that the Port of Churchill could serve as an "Arctic gateway", accepting container ships from Asia whose containers would then be transported south by rail to major destinations in North America. Churchill has been used to transship grain since 1929. In October 2012, the Financial Post reported that due to delays in the approval of several new pipelines from Alberta's oil fields, oil industry planners were considering shipping oil by rail to Churchill, for loading on panamax oil tankers. Under this plan icebreakers would extend the shipping season. In July 2016 OmniTRAX announced the closure of the Port of Churchill and the end of daily rail freight service to the port. Weekly freight service to the town remained until May 2017, when floods washed out the track.

In 2018, the Port of Churchill, the Hudson Bay Railway, and the Churchill Marine Tank Farm were purchased by Arctic Gateway Group, a public-private partnership that includes Missinippi Rail LP (a consortium of First Nations and local governments), Fairfax Financial and AGT Food and Ingredients. The group engaged Cando Rail Services and Paradox Access Solutions to repair the flood damage. On 1 November 2018, Prime Minister Justin Trudeau joined Churchill residents to celebrate the resumption of rail freight service to the town. Regular freight shipments resumed in late November and passenger service in early December 2018.

Demographics 

As of the 2021 Canada Census, just over 56 per cent of the population is Indigenous and the rest (43 per cent) are non-native. Of the Indigenous population there were 345 First Nations (69 per cent), 80 Métis (16 per cent), 25 Inuit (5 per cent) and 35 people (7 per cent) had multiple Indigenous ancestry.

The non-native population is largely of European descent, although a small number of Black Canadians (2.3%) and Latin Americans (1%) also reside in Churchill.

English is the most commonly spoken language, followed by Cree, Inuktitut, French and Dene.

Attractions 
The town has a modern multiplex centre housing a cinema, cafeteria, public library, hospital, health centre, day care, swimming pool, ice hockey rink, indoor playground, gym, curling rinks and basketball courts. Nearby is the Itsanitaq Museum, operated by the Diocese of Churchill-Baie d'Hudson, with over 850 high quality Inuit carvings on permanent display. The exhibits include historic and contemporary sculptures of stone, bone, and ivory, as well as archaeological and wildlife specimens. The Parks Canada visitor centre also has artifacts on display and makes use of audiovisual presentations of various topics involving the region's natural and archaeological history.

By the late 1980s, both the local government and Parks Canada had successfully educated its population on polar bear safety, significantly reducing lethal confrontations and fuelling ecotourism such that both the community and the polar bears benefited.

Local media

Radio
CHFC 1230 AM – CBC Radio One and the station repeats CBWK-FM from Thompson. CBC news anchor Peter Mansbridge got his start here.
VF2312 96.9 FM – Native Communications

Newspapers
Churchill has a newspaper called The Hudson Bay Post. It is a monthly newspaper "published occasionally", according to the front page.

In the late 1950s the first local paper, the weekly Churchill Observer was produced by an avocational journalist, Jack Rogers, at Defence Research Northern Laboratories (DRNL) and continued for some years even after his departure. Later another small paper, the Taiga Times was published for a few years.

Notable people
Susan Aglukark, singer
Jean-François de Galaup, comte de Lapérouse
Samuel Hearne, explorer
Joseph Lofthouse, an Anglican bishop
Peter Mansbridge, Canadian broadcaster and news anchor
Jens Munk, Danish explorer
Doreen Patterson Reitsma, served a term at the Naval Radio Station
Doreen Redhead, Manitoba Provincial Court Judge
David Thompson, explorer
Jordin Tootoo, NHL player

See also
Arctic Bridge
Churchill—Keewatinook Aski
Churchill (provincial electoral district)
Churchill Water Aerodrome
Keewatinook
Sayisi Dene

References

Further reading
 Brandon, Lorraine. Churchill Hudson Bay, A Guide to Natural and Cultural Heritage (The Churchill Eskimo Museum, 2011). 
 Bussidor, Ida and Bilgen-Reinart, Űstűn. "Night Spirits - The Story of the Relocation of the Sayisi Dene" The University of Manitoba Press 
 Dredge, L. A. Field guide to the Churchill region, Manitoba glaciations, sea level changes, permafrost landforms, and archaeology of the Churchill and Gillam areas. Ottawa, Canada: Geological Survey of Canada, 1992. 
 Eliasson, Kelsey. Polar Bears of Churchill (Munck's Cafe, 2005). 
 MacEwan, Grant. The Battle for the Bay (Prairie Books, 1975). 
 Will Ferguson. Beauty Tips from Moose Jaw: Excursions in the Great Weird North (Canongate Books Ltd, 2006). 

 Lemelin, R. Harvey. "The gawk, the glance, and the gaze: Ocular consumption and polar bear tourism in Churchill, Manitoba, Canada." Current Issues in Tourism 9.6 (2006): 516-534.
 MacIver, Angus & Bernice, Churchill on Hudson Bay, revised edition,2006, .
 Montsion, Jean Michel. "Churchill, Manitoba and the Arctic Gateway: a historical contextualization." Canadian Geographer/Le Géographe canadien 59.3 (2015): 304-316.
 Payne, Michael. "Fort Churchill, 1821-1900: an Outpost Community in the Fur Trade." Manitoba History 20 (1990): 2-15.

External links 

Official website

 
Populated places on Hudson Bay
Port settlements in Canada
Road-inaccessible communities of Canada
Towns in Manitoba